Charlie Winston Gleave, better known as Charlie Winston, is an English singer-songwriter based in the South of France. Winston has so far had his most significant commercial success in France.

Music career

Early career
Winston played bass guitar for his brother Tom Baxter, appearing on Baxter's Feather and Stone album. As well as touring with Tom, much of Winston's early career saw him composing music for, and performing in, London-based contemporary theatre productions.

Mischifus
Winston's first ever unreleased and rarest record was Mischifus, a mix between beatbox, guitar, and piano, which appeared as a theatre/dance production that he had performed on stage in 2007, recorded under the Real World label.

Make Way
Winston's unreleased debut album, Make Way, was recorded at Real World Studios in 2006. Described as "inspired and seductive". Winston supported Peter Gabriel on his 2007 European tour. Tracks from Make Way would eventually find their way on to his first officially released album.

Hobo
Winston's second and the first officially released album, Hobo, entered the French charts at No. 3 on 31 January 2009, and peaked at No. 1 in its 25th charting week where it stayed for 4 weeks and, spent 30 weeks in the Top 10. His debut album has also been certified as being platinum.

The first single, "Like a Hobo", also topped the French SNEP charts for one week on 11 April 2009.

In 2010, Winston won a European Border Breakers Award for 'Best UK artist in Europe'.

Running Still
Winston's third album Running Still was released in France on 21 November 2011.

In 2012, Winston contributed the track "This Wheel's on Fire" to the compilation CD set for Amnesty International titled "Chimes of Freedom – The Songs of Bob Dylan".

Curio City
"Lately", the first single from Winston's fourth album Curio City debuted on French radio station Virgin Radio on 13 October 2014. The album was released on 26 January 2015. In 2016, Winston released an EP with studio versions of songs he covered live during his concerts, called Under Cover.

Square 1
The first single from Winston's fifth album was released on 8 June 2018. It's called "The Weekend". The album, entitled Square 1, was released on 28 September 2018.

US television
On 17 September 2010, Winston headlined a global telecast for the international day of peace Peace One Day with Jude Law and Sharon Stone.

On 10 November 2011, the track "She Went Quietly" was used over the ending of the mid-season finale of Grey's Anatomy (Season 8, Episode 9 "Dark Was The Night").

VW Polo ad
In 2008, his cover of The Spencer Davis Group song "I'm a Man" appeared on a television advertisement for Volkswagen Polo. The ad featured a dog miming the words to the track, and received over 750 complaints from the RSPCA and TV viewers. The ad was not banned, despite the complaints.

Prank
Winston was pranked by Rémi Gaillard at "Les Déferlantes" music Festival in south of France.

Personal life
Winston was born to parents Jeff and Julie Gleave. At an early age he moved to Bungay, Suffolk where his parents owned the King's Head Hotel. His older brother, Tom Baxter, and younger sister, Vashti Anna, are also musicians and all use their middle name as a stage surname. Winston currently lives in London.

Discography

Albums

Singles

1 Digital Downloads
*Did not appear in the official Belgian Ultratop 50 charts, but rather in the bubbling under Ultratip charts.

Featured in

References

External links 
 
 Charlie Winston – Live pictures in Paris (Olympia)
 Personal Interview with Charlie Winston

Year of birth missing (living people)
Date of birth missing (living people)
Living people
English male singer-songwriters
People from Bungay
People from Cornwall
21st-century English singers
21st-century British male singers